Tashkuh-e Sofla (also Romanized as Tāshkūh-e Soflá) is a village in Mian Band Rural District, in the Central District of Nur County, Mazandaran Province, Iran. At the 2006 census, its population was 988, in 241 families.

References 

Populated places in Nur County